Jeunesse Sportive Kairouan, also known as JS Kairouan, is a Tunisian professional basketball club from Kairouan. The club competes in the Championnat National A, the highest league in Tunisian basketball. Kariouan has won the league three times, with three consecutive titles in 2001, 2002 and 2003.

The team plays its home games in the Salle Kairouan, which has a capacity of 2,000 people. The team colors are green and white.

In March 2019, the club qualified for 2018–19 Africa Basketball League Elite 8.

Honours
Tunisian League
Winners (3): 2001, 2002, 2003
Tunisian Basketball Cup
Winners (2): 2002, 2005

In African competitions
FIBA Africa Basketball League  (1 appearances)
2018–19 – Fourth Place

Players

Current roster

See also 
 JS Kairouan

References

External links
Official website

Basketball teams in Tunisia
Basketball teams established in 1942
1942 establishments in Tunisia